Libertador General San Martín Department may refer to:
Libertador General San Martín Department, Misiones
Libertador General San Martín Department, Chaco
Libertador General San Martín Department, San Luis

Department name disambiguation pages